Malignant Man is a 2011 graphic novel by James Wan.

Synopsis
Diagnosed with terminal cancer, Alan Gates is resigned to die, until he learns that his tumor is really a parasite. With a new lease on life and incredible, otherworldly powers, Alan must fight against an evil army buried beneath society's skin, all the while unlocking the secrets of his forgotten past.

Film adaptation
In June 2014, 20th Century Fox acquired the rights to the comic and set James Wan to direct and produce the adaptation. In 2016, Brad Peyton signed on to direct the film with Wan still producing the film through his Atomic Monster Productions banner.

References 

2011 graphic novels
Works by James Wan